Named after Osamu Tezuka, the  is a yearly manga prize awarded to manga artists or their works that follow the Osamu Tezuka manga approach founded and sponsored by Asahi Shimbun. The prize has been awarded since 1997, in Tokyo, Japan.

Current prizes categories
Grand Prize – for the excellent work during the year
Creative Award – for the creator with innovative or epoch-making expression and fresh talent
Short story Award – for the excellent work or creator of the short story
Special Award – for the person or group who contributed to extend the culture of manga

Prizes winners

1997
Grand Prize: Fujiko Fujio for Doraemon
Award for Excellence: Moto Hagio for A Cruel God Reigns
Special Award: Toshio Naiki for the foundation and management of Modern Manga Library

1998
Grand Prize: Jiro Taniguchi and Natsuo Sekikawa for the trilogy Bocchan No Jidai (Times of "Botchan")
Award for Excellence: Yūji Aoki for Naniwa Kin'yūdō (The way of the Ōsaka loan shark)
Special Award: Shotaro Ishinomori for the long years of contribution to manga

1999

Grand Prize: Naoki Urasawa for Monster
Award for Excellence: Akira Sasō for Shindō
Special Award: Fusanosuke Natsume for the excellence criticism of manga

2000
Grand Prize: Daijiro Morohoshi for Saiyū Yōenden (The Monkey King and other Chinese Legends)
Award for Excellence: Minetarō Mochizuki for Dragon Head
Special Award: Frederik L. Schodt for the distinguished service to introduce Japanese manga round the world

2001
Grand Prize: Reiko Okano and Baku Yumemakura for Onmyōji (The Master of Shade and Light)
Award for Excellence: Kotobuki Shiriagari for Yajikita in Deep
Special Award: Akira Maruyuma for the valuable service to support comic artists at Tokiwa house

2002
Grand Prize: Takehiko Inoue for Vagabond
Award for Excellence: Kentaro Miura for Berserk

2003
Grand Prize: Fumiko Takano for The Yellow Book: A friend Named Jacques Thibault
Creative Award: Yumi Hotta and Takeshi Obata for Hikaru no Go
Short story Award: Hisaichi Ishii for Gendai Shisō no Sōnanshātachi (Victims of modern ideas)
Special Award: Shigeru Mizuki for the creative pictures and the long years of activities

2004
Grand Prize: Kyoko Okazaki for Helter Skelter
Creative Award: Takashi Morimoto for Naniwadora ihon (Variant edition of the Naniwa wastrel)
Short story Award: Risu Akizuki for OL Shinkaron and other works
Special Award: Tarō Minamoto for the pioneer works of historical manga and contribution to manga culture

2005
Grand Prize: Naoki Urasawa, Osamu Tezuka and Takashi Nagasaki for Pluto
Creative Award: Fumiyo Kōno for Town of Evening Calm, Country of Cherry Blossoms
Short story Award: Rieko Saibara for Jōkyō Monogatari and Mainichi Kaasan
Special Award: Kawasaki City Museum for the collection of manga works from Edo period to the present day, and its exhibitions

2006
Grand Prize: Hideo Azuma for Disappearance Diary
Creative Award: Asa Higuchi for Big Windup!
Short story Award: Risa Itō for One Woman, Two Cats, Oi Piitan!! (Hey Pitan!), Onna no mado (A Woman's Window) and other works
Special Award: Kousei Ono for the long years of the introduction of comics from abroad to Japan as a commentator for manga

2007
Grand Prize: Ryoko Yamagishi for Terpsichora (The Dancing Girl; Maihime Τερψιχόρα)
Creative Award: Nobuhisa Nozoe, Kazuhisa Iwata and Kyojin Ōnishi for Shinsei Kigeki (Divine Comedy)
Short story Award: Hiromi Morishita for Ōsaka Hamlet

2008

Grand Prize: Masayuki Ishikawa for Moyashimon 
Creative Award: Toranosuke Shimada for Träumerei
Short story Award: Yumiko Ōshima for GūGū Datte Neko De Aru (Cher Gou-Gou...mon petit chat, mon petit ami.)
Special Award: International Institute for Children's Literature, Osaka Prefecture (English Official site)

2009
Grand Prize: Fumi Yoshinaga for Ōoku: The Inner Chambers
Grand Prize: Yoshihiro Tatsumi for A Drifting Life
Short story Award: Hikaru Nakamura for Saint Young Men
New Artist Prize : Suehiro Maruo for Panorama-tō Kitan (Anecdote of the Panorama Island)

2010
Grand Prize: Yoshihiro Yamada for Hyouge Mono
Short story Award: Mari Yamazaki for Thermae Romae
New Artist Prize : Haruko Ichikawa for Mushi to Uta
Special Award: Yoshihiro Yonezawa  to wide achievements of the collection and the commentary activity of basic material of the cartoon research.

2011
Grand Prize: Motoka Murakami for Jin
Grand Prize: Issei Eifuku and Taiyo Matsumoto for Takemitsuzamurai
New Artist Prize: Hiromu Arakawa for Fullmetal Alchemist
Short Work Prize: Keisuke Yamashina for his work in creating C-kyū Salaryman Kōza, Papa wa Nanda ka Wakaranai, and other salaryman manga.

2012
Grand Prize: Hitoshi Iwaaki for Historie
New Artist Prize: Yu Itō for Shut Hell
Short Work Prize: Roswell Hosoki for his work in creating Sake no Hosomichi, and other manga.
Special Award: "That Weekly Shōnen Jump" - a specific copy of the magazine's 16th issue of 2011 that was shared by over 100 children at the Shiokawa Shoten bookstore in Itsutsubashi, Sendai immediately after the Great East Japan earthquake

2013
Grand Prize: Yasuhisa Hara for Kingdom
New Artist Prize: Miki Yamamoto for Sunny Sunny Ann!
Short Work Prize: Yoshiie Gōda for Kikai-Jikake no Ai (Love of Machine)

2014
Grand Prize: Chica Umino for March Comes in Like a Lion
New Artist Prize: Machiko Kyō for Mitsuami no Kamisama
Short Work Prize: Yūki Shikawa for Onnoji
Special Award: Fujiko Fujio (A) for Manga Michi and Ai... Shirisomeshi Koro ni...
Readers' Award: Chūya Koyama for Space Brothers

2015
Grand Prize: Yoiko Hoshi for Aisawa Riku
New Creator Prize: Yoshitoki Ōima for A Silent Voice
Short Work Prize: Sensha Yoshida for his works as a whole
Special Prize: Chikako Mitsuhashi for Chiisana Koi no Monogatari

2016
Grand Prize: Kei Ichinoseki for Hanagami Sharaku and Kiyohiko Azuma for Yotsuba&!
New Creator Prize: Yuki Andō for Machida-kun no Sekai
Short Work Prize: Tatsuya Nakazaki for Jimihen
Special Prize: Kyoto International Manga Museum in recognition of its 10th anniversary and its contributions to manga culture

2017
Grand Prize: Fusako Kuramochi for Hana ni Somu
New Creator Prize: Haruko Kumota for Descending Stories: Showa Genroku Rakugo Shinju
Short Work Prize: Kahoru Fukaya for Yomawari Neko
Special Prize: Osamu Akimoto for Kochira Katsushika-ku Kameari Kōen-mae Hashutsujo

2018
Grand Prize: Satoru Noda for Golden Kamuy
New Creator Prize: Paru Itagaki for BEASTARS
Short Work Prize: Taro Yabe for Oya-san to Boku
Special Prize: Tetsuya Chiba for Ashita no Joe

2019
Grand Prize: Shinobu Arima for Jitterbug The Forties
New Creator Prize: Sansuke Yamada for Areyo Hoshikuzu
Short Work Prize: Ken Koyama for Little Miss P
Special Prize: Takao Saito for Golgo 13 in recognition of its 50th anniversary

2020 

 Grand Prize: Kan Takahama for Nyx no Lantern
 New Creator Prize: Rettō Tajima for Mizu wa Umi ni Mukatte Nagareru
 Short Work Prize: Yama Wayama for Captivated, by You
 Special Prize: Machiko Hasegawa in recognition of what would have been her 100th birthday on January 20

2021 
 Grand Prize: Kazumi Yamashita for Land
 New Creator Prize: Kanehito Yamada and Tsukasa Abe for Frieren: Beyond Journey's End
 Short Work Prize: Hiroko Nobara for Kieta Mama Tomo and Tsuma wa Kuchi o Kiite Kuremasen
 Special Prize: Koyoharu Gotouge for creating a social phenomenon with Demon Slayer: Kimetsu no Yaiba

2022 
 Grand Prize: Uoto for Chi: On the Movements of the Earth
 New Creator Prize: Natsuko Taniguchi for Kyōshitsu no Katasumi de Seishun wa Hajimaru and Konya Sukiyaki da yo
 Short Work Prize: Izumi Okaya for Ii Toshi o and Hakumokuren wa Kirei ni Chiranai

See also

 List of manga awards
 Tezuka Award

References

External links

Official webpage at Asahi Shimbun 

 
Manga awards
Awards established in 1997
Comics awards
1997 establishments in Japan